"Oceans" is a song by Canadian rock band The Tea Party. It was released as a promotional single in Canada, and their last single before disbanding. The music video was created by a team of animators and motion graphics students at York University headed by Jaimie Webster and Jonathon Corbiére.

"Oceans" was written in dedication to The Tea Party's late manager Steve Hoffman, who died of lung cancer in 2003. With the release of the single, The Tea Party hoped to bring more attention to the Steven Hoffman Fund.

References

External links
 Dedication by Stuart Chatwood and the music video

2005 singles
The Tea Party songs
Song recordings produced by Gavin Brown (musician)
2004 songs
EMI Records singles